The United Wrestling Coalition (UWC) United States Championship is a professional wrestling championship in the American independent professional wrestling promotion United Wrestling Coalition.  It became an official title on May 4, 2003 when Rob Eckos became the first champion.  The title was retired on September 10, 2011, and reinstated on December 1, 2012.  The championship is held by Bobby Banks, who is in his first reign as champion. There have been 36 reigns by 31 wrestlers, ten vacancies, one reign where two wrestlers were recognized as co-champion, three reigns which are not officially recognized by the UWC, and is the only UWC championship to date to be held by a woman.

Title lineage

List of combined reigns

See also
UWC Heavyweight Championship
UWC Tag Team Championship
List of UWC Championships

References

Tag team wrestling championships
United Wrestling Coalition championships